The 1911 Arizona gubernatorial election took place on December 12, 1911, for the post of the first elected Governor of Arizona. The Democratic nominee George W. P. Hunt defeated the Republican nominee Edmund W. Wells. Hunt and Wells were both members of the Constitutional Convention, Hunt being chosen President and leading the way for much of the drafting. Wells refused to sign the Constitution, considering aspects like the initiative, referendum, and especially judicial recall to be too radical.

These fears proved prophetic when it was originally rejected by fellow Republican, former judge, and incumbent President William Howard Taft. Wells' refusal to sign, and Taft's veto of, the state constitution hurt but did not cripple his electoral chances, as he only lost by less than 2,000 votes out of about 21,000 cast. 

George W. P. Hunt was sworn in as Arizona's first elected Governor on February 12, 1912.

Democratic primary

Candidates
George W. P. Hunt, President of the Arizona Constitutional Convention, former President of the Legislative Council, and businessman.
Thomas F. Weedin, editor of the Blade-Tribune.
Henry A. Hughes, physician.

Results

General election

Results

References

Bibliography

1911
Arizona
Gubernatorial
December 1911 events